David Young is an American musician. He is known for his ability to play two recorders simultaneously. He was also a member of the new age duo Celestial Winds with harpist Lisa Franco.

Life and career 
Young started playing the recorder in the third grade in Brooklyn, New York. He studied baroque and renaissance music with Phil Levin and at age 12 he became the youngest member to join the New York Recorder Guild advanced performing group.

Young's music has been featured on the U.S. television series' General Hospital, All My Children and Passions.

He has worked recorded with artists such as Bobby Schnitzer, Cheryl Gallagher, and Robin Berry.

1994: CNN does special segment on David Young's "rags to riches" story. David Young's Christmas Morning CD is #2 in Canada.

1998: Young performs at Heather McCartney's launch of her gift line in Atlanta, Georgia.

2001: David Young Musical Greeting Card line launched.

2004: Young writes, produces and acts in the movie Village of Dreams, filmed at the Käthe Wohlfahrt Christmas store in Rothenburg, Germany.  A companion children's book was made along with the Village of Dreams movie.

2005: David writes and produces a musical called Woodstock: The Mystery of Destiny which has been performed at various theaters.

Discography
Albums
Ancient Treasures (2005)
The Best of Bread (2008)
Beyond Celestial Winds (2004)
Bliss (1996)
Butterfly Kisses
By Candlelight
By Candelight, Volume II
Celestial Winds I
A Christmas Dream (2005)
A Christmas I'll Remember (2006)
Christmas Morning
Creation
David
David Young (2003)
Deep Spirit
Happiness (2003)
Harp Dreams
Home: Songs for America
Imagine (2005)
Imagine, Volume II (2005)
The Inner Child (2005)
Inner Journey's
Life Stories (1996)
Lullabies by the Ocean
Merry Christmas (2003)
Midnight Serenade (2007)
Mystical Journey
Oceans of Love (2004)
Perfect Wedding
Renaissance (2003)
A Renaissance Christmas (2003)
Romantic Moments
Romantic Moments II
Sacred Guitar
Sacred Love Songs
Solace
Songs of Hope (2005)
Sweet Dreams
Woodstock: The Mystery of Destiny (2005)

Video
From Venice Beach to Woodstock (2007)
Village of Dreams (2006)

References

External links
 David Young's Website
 Video of David Young playing two recorders

Living people
Musicians from Brooklyn
American flautists
New-age musicians
Guitarists from New York (state)
American male guitarists
Year of birth missing (living people)